The Super-iron battery is a moniker for a proposed class of rechargeable electric battery.  Such batteries feature cathodes composed of ferrate salts, either potassium ferrate or barium ferrate.  One attraction to the proposed device is that the spent cathode would consist of a rust-like material, which is preferable to batteries based on cadmium, manganese and nickel.

See also
 List of battery types
Lithium-ion battery
Nanotechnology
Nickel-cadmium battery
Nickel metal hydride battery

References

Further reading 
Super Battery.
Battery Bimonthly,  Vol.34 No. P.247-249. 2004
Energetic Iron(VI) Chemistry: The Super-Iron Battery, Science, Volume 285, p. 1039, 13 August 1999. "Super-Iron" Comes to the Rescue of Batteries, Science, Volume 285, p. 995, 13 August 1999.

Rechargeable batteries